Kanchana Wijesekera (born 27 April 1982) is a Sri Lankan politician who is a member of parliament for Matara District. He is the son of former Cabinet Minister Mahinda Wijesekara.

Following the mass resignation of the Sri Lankan cabinet in the wake of the 2022 Sri Lankan protests, he was appointed as the Minister of Power and Energy by President Gotabaya Rajapaksa on 18 April 2022.

Notes

References

1982 births
Living people
Alumni of Royal College, Colombo
Members of the 15th Parliament of Sri Lanka
Members of the 16th Parliament of Sri Lanka
Alumni of Trinity College, Kandy
People from Matara, Sri Lanka